Michał Nalepa (born 24 March 1995) is a Polish professional footballer who plays as a midfielder for TFF First League side Sakaryaspor.

Career statistics

Club

1 Including 1 match in Polish SuperCup.

Honours

Club
Arka Gdynia
 I liga: 2015–16
 Polish Cup: 2016–17
 Polish Super Cup: 2017, 2018

References

External links

Living people
1995 births
People from Wejherowo
Association football midfielders
Polish footballers
Poland youth international footballers
Poland under-21 international footballers
Arka Gdynia players
Jagiellonia Białystok players
Giresunspor footballers
Sakaryaspor footballers
Ekstraklasa players
I liga players
III liga players
TFF First League players
Polish expatriate footballers
Expatriate footballers in Turkey
Polish expatriate sportspeople in Turkey